S.S. Lazio finished in fourth in Serie A.

Squad

Goalkeepers
  Luca Marchegiani
  Fernando Orsi
  Giorgio Frezzolini

Defenders
  Cristiano Bergodi
  Mauro Bonomi
  Luigi Corino
  Roberto Cravero
  Giuseppe Favalli
  Alessandro Nesta
  Luca Luzardi
  Paolo Negro

Midfielders
  Roberto Bacci
  Luciano De Paola
  Roberto Di Matteo
  Fabrizio Di Mauro
  Thomas Doll
  Diego Fuser
  Paul Gascoigne
  Dario Marcolin
  Claudio Sclosa
  Aron Winter

Attackers
  Alen Bokšić
  Pierluigi Casiraghi
  Giuseppe Signori
  Giampaolo Saurini

Transfers

Winter

Competitions

Serie A

League table

Results by round

Matches

Top scorers
  Giuseppe Signori 23 (6)
  Roberto Cravero 6 (3)
  Alen Bokšić 5
  Pierluigi Casiraghi 4
  Roberto Di Matteo 4
  Aron Winter 4

Coppa Italia

Second round

UEFA Cup

First round

Second round

Statistics

Players statistics

References

S.S. Lazio seasons
Lazio